Georges Alphonse Hatot (22 December 1876 – 8 August 1959) was a theater manager and pioneering French filmmaker during the late 1890s and early twentieth century. He directed the first known film based on the story of Joan of Arc in 1898 as well as having made the first films to feature the Roman emperor Nero. Besides being a director he also wrote the 1908 serial Nick Carter, le roi des détectives which was a major success and spawned many detective series in the following years.

Biography
Georges Alphonse Hatot was born on December 22, 1876 in Paris.

Filmography

References

External links
 

1876 births
1959 deaths
Film directors from Paris
French film directors
French men